Darul Uloom Bolton is an Islamic private secondary school in Bolton, Greater Manchester, England.

History 
The institute was founded in 1993 and initially was based at Bromley Cross in the northern part of Borough of Bolton. In 2006, due to the growth of the institute and demand in pupil places, the institute decided to sell the Bromley Cross premises for a bigger campus closer to the town centre. A bid was put in by the local council to buy the building and adjacent land to build a new houses. Subsequently, the institute relocated to a former convent, where they are based now. In 2008, a former public house was purchased and turned into a second campus for the institute.

Education 
The Darul Uloom strives to produce Islamic scholars of high standards, aiming to include both religious and secular education provisions.

Religious education 
The Islamic education is split into two courses: Islamic Theology course and Hifz (Qur'anic memorisation) course. The Islamic Theology course is for those that want to learn about theological underpinnings of Islam. The curriculum is based on the Dars-i Nizami teaching format that has been in place since the establishment of Darul Uloom Deoband, it is rooted in the Hanafi school of thought. The students are taught many books in relation to subjects such as Tafsir, Hadith, Arabic language, grammar and syntax, Islamic jurisprudence, logic and reasoning and public speaking classes. The course is made up of 7 stages. The Hifz course is for those that want to memorise the Holy Qur'an. This course depends on how long students take to memorise the Holy Qur'an; they are given the guidance and support by their personal tutor.

Secular education 
The school provides school students from the ages of 11–16 secondary-age teaching, which enables them to sit their GCSEs when they reach years 10 and 11. The school offers many subjects to choose to study at GCSE level, including but not limited to Maths, English, Science, History, Geography, Religious Studies, ICT, Modern Foreign Languages and Citizenship. Beyond GCSEs, the school also allows students to complete A-Level and BTEC courses.

Ofsted inspection 
The institute has had many continuous Ofsted inspections, and it is currently 'Inadequate'. It previously had a rating of 'Requires improvement'.

See also
Darul Uloom Bury
Darul Uloom Al-Madania
Darul Uloom London
Darul Uloom Zakariyya
Jamiatul Ilm Wal Huda
Madinatul Uloom Al Islamiya
Mazahirul Uloom Saharanpur

References

Private schools in the Metropolitan Borough of Bolton
Islamic schools in England